The 3.7 cm Flak M42 was the marine version of the  Flak 36/37 and used by the Kriegsmarine on surface ships and as the M42U on Type VII and Type IX U-boats. The 3.7 cm Flak M42U used several types of mounts and entered service in autumn 1943.

3.7 cm Flak M42 
The 3.7 cm Flak M42 was a longer caliber version of the Wehrmacht's 3.7 cm Flak 36, 69 caliber as opposed to 57 caliber. It replaced the older 3.7 cm SK C/30 that had been designed in 1930. The gun was loaded with a five-round ammunition clip, giving it a rate of fire of 250 rounds per minute, unlike the SK C/30 which was single-shot with a rate of 30 rounds per minute. The M42 was also about  lighter than the SK C/30 and had gun shields.

LM 42U Mount
The LM 42U mount was developed specifically for the 3.7 cm Flak M42U. It was manned by a 3-man crew, with a fourth man operating as the loader.

DLM 42U Mount
The twin mount was based on the LM 42U design, in which the 3.7 cm Flak M42U guns were mounted side by side.

LM 43U Mount
The LM 43U mount was the final design of mount used on U-boats. It was a further improvement on the LM 42U. The LM 43U was only known to be installed on these U-boats (and ).

Gallery

References

Bibliography

Further reading

External links

World War II artillery of Germany
World War II anti-aircraft guns
Anti-aircraft guns of Germany
37 mm artillery
Rheinmetall
Naval guns of Germany
Naval anti-aircraft guns
Weapons and ammunition introduced in 1942